The boycott of the 1984 Summer Olympics in Los Angeles followed four years after the American-led boycott of the 1980 Summer Olympics in Moscow. The boycott involved 14 Eastern Bloc countries and allies, led by the Soviet Union, which initiated the boycott on May 8, 1984. Boycotting countries organized another major event, called the Friendship Games, in July and August 1984. Although the boycott led by the Soviet Union affected Olympic events that were normally dominated by the absent countries, 140 nations still took part in the games, which was a record at the time.

Announcement of boycott 
The USSR announced its intentions to boycott the 1984 Summer Olympics on May 8, 1984, claiming "security concerns and chauvinistic sentiments and an anti-Soviet hysteria being whipped up in the United States." A US official said the country had ignored suggestive comments by the Soviet Union in the weeks building up to the announcement and that, in spite of all the indications, the United States was "absolutely dumbfounded" when the official announcement arrived.

After the announcement, six more Soviet Eastern Bloc satellites joined the boycott, including Bulgaria, East Germany (on May 10), Mongolia and Vietnam (both May 11), Laos, and Czechoslovakia (both May 13). Meanwhile, China formally confirmed that it would be present at the games in Los Angeles.

Later, the Soviet-dominated Afghanistan also announced its withdrawal, becoming the eighth country to join the boycott of the 1984 Summer Olympics. Then, Hungary (May 16) and Poland (May 17) became the ninth and tenth Communist countries to join the boycott. Hungary claimed the lives of its athletes would be put in danger if they were to spend time in Los Angeles. On the other hand, Poland said that the United States was engaging in a "campaign aimed at disturbing the Games".

On May 23, Cuba became the eleventh country to announce its participation in the boycott, making front-page news in the United States because it was a "serious blow to boxing and baseball". South Yemen was the twelfth country to remove itself from the event (May 27); the Los Angeles Times stated that this was due to their "Marxist connections". North Korea was the thirteenth nation to boycott the 1984 Olympics. Ethiopia became the first African state to participate in the boycott, followed by Angola.

Iran had earlier decided to boycott the games because of "United States interference in the Middle East, its support for the regime occupying Jerusalem, and the crimes being committed by the U.S.A. in Latin America, especially in El Salvador". Iran and Albania were the only countries to not attend both the 1980 Moscow and the 1984 Los Angeles Olympics. Libya also boycotted the Olympics after Libyan journalists were refused entry into the United States in July, after Libya announced the ban upon US exports to Libya in 1983 and a renewal of bans upon travel to Libya by holders of US passports. Libya and Ethiopia were the only nations to boycott both the 1976 Montreal and 1984 Los Angeles Games.

In addition, Albania did not attend any games from 1976 to 1988, although there was no official explanation for their absence at the 1976 Montreal Olympics and 1988 Seoul Olympics. Politically, Albania allied with China after the Sino-Soviet split, remaining antagonistic towards the Soviet Union; however, it also opposed China's rapprochement with the United States in the late 1970s, resulting in the Sino-Albanian split. A similar antagonism towards both superpowers existed in Iran since 1979. This resulted in Iran and Albania boycotting both the 1980 and 1984 Olympics independently without endorsing the boycott on the opposing side.

Revenge hypothesis 
Jimmy Carter declared that the United States would boycott the 1980 Olympic Games in Moscow, with 65 other countries joining the boycott. This was the largest Olympic Games boycott ever. In 1984, three months before the start of the 1984 Summer Olympics in Los Angeles, the Soviet Union declared it would "not participate" in the Games. The Soviets cited a number of reasons, namely the commercialization of the games which, in their opinion, went against the principles of the Olympic movement (indeed the XXIII Olympiad ended up being the first Olympics since 1932 to make a profit by a host country) and a claimed lack of security for their athletes. The issue of commercialization did gather some criticism from foreign delegations, who were unfamiliar with this trend in the Olympic movement. However, the IOC later recognized the Games "a model for future Olympics" due to a surplus of US$223 million for the hosts, exclusively private funding (unlike Moscow Olympics that were state-funded), and relying on existing venues instead of building new ones. The majority viewed the boycott as more of a retaliatory move by the Soviets.

Most of the world's media also interpreted the Soviet boycott as retaliation for the US boycott of the 1980 Moscow Games, which had been in response to the 1979 Soviet invasion of Afghanistan, whereas the Soviet media repeated the government line that the boycott was a safety measure to protect their own athletes. Athletes from the one Eastern Bloc country that did attend the 1984 games in Los Angeles—Romania—received a standing ovation at the Opening Ceremonies upon making their Coliseum entrance. Romania ended up finishing third in overall medal count at the Games.

Among those subscribing to the "revenge hypothesis" was Peter Ueberroth, the chief organizer of the 1984 L.A. Games, who expressed his views in a press conference after the boycott was announced, on the same day that the Olympic torch relay in the United States began in New York City. U.S. President Ronald Reagan later stated his belief that the Soviets feared some of their athletes might defect. As well, the Reagan Administration agreed to meet all of the demands of the Soviet Union in turn for the Soviet Bloc's attendance at the 1984 Olympics, marking an exception to Reagan's generally "hawkish" Cold War foreign policy. As more countries withdrew, the IOC announced on the deadline week that it would consider extending the deadline for entry into the Olympics. The three top medal winners from the 1980 Games (which was the subject of a boycott by sixty-six nations) in Moscow were among the boycotters, and media analysis noted this would weaken the field of competitors in a number of sports. However, it was later disclosed that both the Soviet Union and East Germany boosted their performances with the help of state-run steroid programs.

Soviet doping plan 
Documents obtained in 2016 revealed the Soviet Union's plans for a statewide doping system in track and field in preparation for the 1984 Summer Olympics in Los Angeles. Dated prior to the country's decision to boycott the Games, the document detailed the existing steroids operations of the program, along with suggestions for further enhancements. The communication, directed to the Soviet Union's head of track and field, was prepared by Sergei Portugalov of the Institute for Physical Culture. Portugalov was also one of the main figures involved in the implementation of the Russian doping program prior to the 2016 Summer Olympics. Bryan Fogel, director of the 2017 film Icarus, has said that stricter doping controls might have been the main reason for the Soviet boycott.

Boycotting countries 
Listed in the chronological order of their withdrawal, not by alphabetical or any geographical order.

 
  Bulgaria
 
  Mongolia
 
 
  Czechoslovakia
  Afghanistan
  Hungary
  Poland
 
 
  Ethiopia
 
  Angola

All the Asian countries above also boycotted at the 1986 Asian Games in Seoul, South Korea.

Three other countries also boycotted the games, citing political reasons, but were not part of the Soviet-led boycott:

  Albania
 
  Libya

Further to this, Kampuchea was largely unrecognized, and in any case would not have been allowed to compete.

Non-boycotting Marxist-Leninist countries 
Seven communist and socialist countries, four from Africa, did not join the Soviet-led boycott and instead sent teams to the 1984 Summer Olympics.

  Benin
  was somewhat hostile towards the Soviet Union at the time, but had been experiencing a cordial relationship with the United States. In 1980, China had sent a team to the Winter Olympics in the United States, while boycotting the Summer Olympics in the Soviet Union.
  Congo
  Mozambique
  Romania was the only member of the Warsaw Pact that did not boycott the Games. Its leader, Nicolae Ceaușescu, was famous for openly opposing various policies of the Soviet Union; he was awarded the Olympic Order in 1985 for this issue.
  Somalia had broken relations with the Soviet Union after the latter's support for Ethiopia in the Ethio-Somali War.
  Yugoslavia was a non-aligned country that acted independently of the Soviet Union. Yugoslavia shared friendly relations with both the Soviet Union and the United States, therefore it did not participate in either of the boycotts. It had just hosted the 1984 Winter Olympics.

Alternative events 
The Soviets organized the Friendship Games, a full-scale multi-sport event, for boycotting countries. The Games were contested in 22 Olympic disciplines (all except association football and synchronized swimming), and in non-Olympic table tennis, tennis, and sambo wrestling. The Soviet Union dominated the medal table, winning 126 gold and 282 total medals.

See also 

 1980 Summer Olympics boycott
 1986 Asian Games
 List of Olympic Games boycotts

References 

Boycott, 1984 Summer Olympics
History of sport in East Germany
Olympic Games controversies
Soviet Union–United States relations
China–Soviet Union relations
Summer Olympics boycott
Summer Olympics Boycott, 1984
Eastern Bloc
1984 in Soviet sport
International sports boycotts